Vasculitic neuropathy is a peripheral neuropathic disease. In a vasculitic neuropathy  there is damage to the vessels that supply blood to the nerves. It can be as part of a systemic problem or can exist as a single-organ issue only affecting the peripheral nervous system (PNS). It is diagnosed with the use of electrophysiological testing, blood tests, nerve biopsy and clinical examination. It is a serious medical condition that can cause prolonged morbidity and disability and generally requires treatment. Treatment depends on the type but it is mostly with corticosteroids or immunomodulating therapies.

Types 
There are three main categories of vasculitic neuropathies: primary, secondary and non-systemic.

Primary systemic vasculitic neuropathy 
Some patients with systemic vasculitis will have their multi-organ disease spread to the peripheral nervous system; this is primary vasculitic neuropathy. Some examples of systemic vasculitic disease are: IgA vasculitis, Hypocomplementemic urticarial vasculitis, polyarteritis nodosa (PAN) and anti-neutrophil cytoplasmic antibody (ANCA) associated vasculitides such as granulomatosis with polyangiitis (GPA), eosinophilic granulomatosis with polyangiitis (EGPA) and microscopic polyangiitis (MPA).

Vasculitic neuropathy secondary to other disease 
Some patients with a non-vasculitic systemic disease or another illness such as infection or malignancy can subsequently develop vasculitic neuropathy as a direct consequence of the former illness; this is secondary vasculitic neuropathy. Some examples of such illness which can cause vasculitic neuropathy are:
 Connective tissue diseases: rheumatoid arthritis, systemic lupus erythematosus, primary sjögren's, dermatomyositis.
 Infectious diseases: hepatitis B, hepatitis C, human immunodeficiency virus (HIV), cytomegalovirus, lyme disease, human T-cell-lymphotrophic virus-I, parvovirus B19.
 Malignancy.
 Drugs (amphetamines, sympathomimetics, cocaine, etc.)
 Vaccinations.

Non-systemic vasculitic neuropathy 
Non-systemic vasculitic neuropathy (NSVN) is a diagnosis of elimination. When no systemic illness can be found, yet evidence of a vasculitic neuropathy exists, a diagnosis of non-systemic vasculitic neuropathy is made. It is a single-organ problem. A nerve biopsy is required in order to make the diagnosis of non-systemic vasculitic neuropathy.

There are distinct subtypes of NSVN with evolving categorisation in the literature. Currently accepted subtypes are:
 'Classical' distal-predominant NSVN
 Wartenberg migratory sensory neuropathy
 Post-surgical inflammatory neuropathy
 Diabetic radiculoplexus neuropathy (lumbosacral, thoracic or cervical predominant)
 Neuralgic amyotrophy
 Non-systemic skin/nerve vasculitis (for example, cutaneous PAN)

'Classical' distal-predominant NSVN 
There is an ongoing debate over this categorisation, particularly its overlap with the condition non-diabetic radiculoplexus neuropathy. This neuropathy involves a clinical picture where the nerve damage is distally predominant as demonstrated in a nerve biopsy.

Warternberg migratory sensory neuropathy 
Warternberg migratory sensory neuropathy is typically a multi-focal neuropathy where there is pure sensory deficits. It is characterised by sudden-onset and chronicity as well as having a propensity for relapse. It generally resolves slowly with time.

Postsurgical inflammatory neuropathy 
Postsurgical inflammatory neuropathy is typically a multi-focal neuropathy which manifests thirty days after a surgical procedure. It mostly presents with motor and sensory symptoms. It is generally a self-limiting condition that has resolved with and without treatment.

Diagnosis 
Diagnosis of a vasculitic neuropathy depends on whether the patient first presents with multiple symptoms pointing at a systemic disorder or else primary neuropathic complaints. In the former case the patient is more likely to be assessed first by a rheumatologist and in the latter a neurologist or neurosurgeon.

Treatments 
Treatment of vasculitic neuropathy depends on the type.

References

Vascular diseases
Peripheral nervous system disorders